In algebraic geometry, the Stein factorization, introduced by  for the case of complex spaces, states that a proper morphism can be factorized as a composition of a finite mapping and a proper morphism with connected fibers. Roughly speaking, Stein factorization contracts the connected  components of the fibers of a mapping to points.

Statement
One version for schemes states the following:
Let X be a scheme, S a locally noetherian scheme and  a proper morphism. Then one can write

The existence of this decomposition itself is not difficult. See below. But, by Zariski's connectedness theorem, the last part in the above says that the fiber  is connected for any . It follows:

Corollary: For any , the set of connected components of the fiber  is in bijection with the set of points in the fiber .

Proof 
Set: 

where SpecS is the relative Spec. The construction gives the natural map , which is finite since  is coherent and f is proper. The morphism f factors through g and one gets , which is proper. By construction, . One then uses the theorem on formal functions to show that the last equality implies  has connected fibers. (This part is sometimes referred to as Zariski's connectedness theorem.)

See also 
Contraction morphism

References 

Algebraic geometry